Didacus of Alcalá, also known as Diego de San Nicolás, was a Spanish Franciscan lay brother who served as among the first group of missionaries to the newly conquered Canary Islands. He died at Alcalá de Henares on 12 November 1463 and is now honored by the Catholic Church as a saint.

History 

Didacus was born  into a poor but pious family in the small village of San Nicolás del Puerto in the Kingdom of Seville. As a child, he embraced the hermit life and, later, placed himself under the direction of a hermit priest living not far from his native town. He then led the life of a wandering hermit. Feeling called to the religious life, he applied for admission to the Observant (or Reformed) branch of the Order of Friars Minor at the friary in Albaida and was sent to the friary in Arruzafa, near Córdoba, where he was received as a lay brother.

During his years living in that location, he journeyed to the villages in the regions surrounding Córdoba, Cádiz and Seville, where he would preach to the people. A strong devotion to him still exists in those towns.

Missionary 
Didacus was sent to the new friary of the Order in Arrecife on the island of Lanzarote, part of the Canary Islands. That island had been conquered by Jean de Béthencourt about 40 years earlier and was still in the process of introducing the native Guanche people to Christianity. He was assigned to the post of porter.

In 1445, Didacus was appointed as Guardian of the Franciscan community on the island of Fuerteventura, where the Observant Franciscans soon founded the Friary of St. Bonaventure. There, though it was an exception to the ordinary rules for a lay brother to be named to this position, his great zeal, prudence, and sanctity justified this choice.

In 1450, Didacus was recalled to Spain, from which point he went to Rome to share in the Jubilee Year proclaimed by Pope Nicholas V, and to be present at the canonization of Bernardine of Siena. In addition to the vast crowds of pilgrims arriving in Rome for Jubilee Year, thousands of friars had headed to Rome to take part in the celebration of one of the pillars of their Order. These travelers brought with them various infections, which broke out into an epidemic in the city. Didacus spent three months caring for the sick at the friary attached to the Basilica of Santa Maria in Ara Coeli, and his biographers record the miraculous cure of many whom he attended through his pious intercession. He was then recalled again to Spain and was sent by his superiors to the Friary of Santa María de Jesús in Alcalá, where he spent the remaining years of his life in penance, solitude, and the delights of contemplation. There he died on 12 November 1463 due to an abscess. It was said that it amazed everyone that instead of a foul odor, fragrance emitted from his infection. His body was also rumored to have remained incorrupt, did not undergo rigor mortis and continued to emit a pleasant odor.

A chapel, the Ermita de San Diego, was built in Didacus's birthplace between 1485 and 1514 to enshrine his remains in his native town.

Veneration

Didacus was canonized by Pope Sixtus V in 1588, the first after a long hiatus following the Reformation, and the first of a lay brother of the Order of Friars Minor. His feast day is celebrated on 13 November, since 12 November, the anniversary of his death, was occupied, first by that of Pope Martin I, then by that of the Basilian monk and Eastern Catholic bishop and martyr, Josaphat Kuntsevych. Until 1969, the Franciscans celebrated his feast day on 12 November. In the United States the feast day is celebrated on 7 November, due to the feast of Saint Frances Xavier Cabrini.

Didacus is the saint to whom the Franciscan mission that bears his name, and which developed into the City of San Diego, California, was dedicated. He is thereby the patron of the Roman Catholic Diocese of San Diego.

The Spanish painter Bartolomé Estéban Murillo is noted for painting several representations of Didacus of Alcalá.

Miracles
On a hunting trip, Henry IV of Castile fell from his horse and injured his arm. In intense pain and with his doctors unable to relieve his agony, he went to Alcalá and prayed to Didacus for a cure. Didacus's body was removed from his casket and placed beside the king. Henry then kissed the body and placed Didacus's hand on his injured arm. The king felt the pain disappear and his arm immediately regained its former strength.
Don Carlos, Prince of Asturias, son of King Philip II of Spain, was of a difficult and rebellious character. On the night of 19 April 1562, he was groping around in the dark after a night spent with some ladies when he fell down a flight of stairs and landed on his head. There he was found the next morning, unconscious and partially paralyzed. He later became blind, developed a high fever and his head swelled to an enormous size. In a moment of lucidity, he asked that he wanted to make a personal petition to Saint Didacus. Didacus's body was brought to his chambers. The prior of the convent placed one of Carlos' hands upon the chest of Didacus, whereupon the prince fell into a deep and peaceful sleep. Six hours later, he awoke and related that in a dream, he saw Didacus telling him that he would not die. The prince recovered from his brush with death. Other sources have Didacus's body laid on the prince's bed.

Mechanical model

The Smithsonian Institution holds a clockwork automaton of a monk.
The model would perform a number of set actions, including the beating of the breast which accompanies the  prayer.
A possible provenance would be a presumed model of Didacus, commissioned by Philip II of Spain to Juanelo Turriano, mechanic to Emperor Charles V.

Historical theories for why the friar was built include that: Philip II wished to share the miracle of his son's recovery with his people; or the clockwork friar provided a portable model of "how to pray" which could be displayed around the kingdom.

See also 

San Diego, California
Mission San Diego de Alcalá
Alcalá de Henares
Franciscan Order
Noli Me Tangere (novel)
Incorruptibility

Notes

References

External links 

Catholic Encyclopedia: St. Didacus
Catholic-Forum.com: Saint Didacus
abcgallery.com: Bartolomé Esteban Murillo's La Cuisine des Anges
abcgallery.com: Bartolomé Esteban Murillo's St. Diego Giving Alms
Franciscan Order
Cofradia Semana Santa San Nicolas del Puerto, Seville 

1400s births
1463 deaths
People from Sierra Norte (Seville)
Spanish hermits
Spanish Friars Minor
Spanish Roman Catholic missionaries
Infectious disease deaths in Spain
Spanish Roman Catholic saints
Franciscan saints
Canonized Roman Catholic religious brothers
15th-century Castilians
15th-century Christian saints
Burials in the Province of Seville
Incorrupt saints
People from Alcalá de Henares